Tam Shepherds Trick Shop is a magic equipment shop in Glasgow, Scotland. It was established in 1886 and is the oldest joke and magic shop in the United Kingdom.

Location 
The shop is located at 33 Queen Street, Glasgow near the site of the former Archaos nightclub.

History 

The shop was opened in 1886 by Tam Shepherd before being operated by the Walton family. It is the oldest joke and magic shop in the UK.

In 2017, the shop was identified as Glasgow's favourite business at the Glasgow Business Awards. In 2018, the shop hosted the Good £uck art exhibition as part of Glasgow International 2018.

The shop was credited by Jerry Sadowitz for sparking his interest in magic. It was owned by Roy Walton until his death in 2020. Walton managed the shop from 1969 to 2019 before handing management over to his daughters Julia and Sarah.

References

External links
 

1886 establishments in Scotland
1886 establishments in the United Kingdom
Magic shops
Shops in the United Kingdom
Retail companies established in 1886